Bunkpurugu-Yunyoo was one of the constituencies represented in the Parliament of Ghana. It elected its Member of Parliament (MP) by the first past the post system of election. Bunkpurugu-Yunyoo was located in the Bunkpurugu-Yunyoo district  of the erstwhile Northern Region of Ghana. It was split into the Bunkpurugu and Yunyoo constituencies prior to the 2012 Ghanaian general election.

Boundaries
The seat is located within the Bole district of the Northern Region of Ghana.

Members of Parliament

Elections

See also
 List of Ghana Parliament constituencies

References 

Parliamentary constituencies in the Northern Region (Ghana)